Forsyth is a Scottish surname. It may refer to:

A
 Adam Forsyth (born 1981), Australian Olympic boxer 
 Alastair Forsyth (born 1976), Scottish professional golfer
 Alex Forsyth (disambiguation), several people
 Ali Forsyth (born 1979), New Zealand international lawn and indoor bowler
 Allan Forsyth (born 1955), Scottish footballer
 Allison Forsyth (born 1978), Canadian alpine skier
 Amanda Forsyth (born 1966), Canadian cellist
 Andrew Forsyth (1858–1942), British mathematician
 Andy Forsyth (born 1990), English rugby-union player
 Archibald Forsyth (1826–1908), Scottish-born Australian politician

B
 Benjamin Forsyth (died 1814), U.S. Army officer in the War of 1812
 Bill Forsyth (diplomat) (1909–1993), Australian diplomat
 Bill Forsyth (born 1946), Scottish film director
 Brandon Forsyth (born 1979), American figure skater
 Brigit Forsyth (born 1940), Scottish actress
 Bruce Forsyth (1928–2017), British entertainer

C
 C. E. Forsyth (1849–1933), American politician
 Campbell Forsyth (1934–2020), Kilmarnock and Scotland international goalkeeper 
 Cecil Forsyth (1870–1941), British composer
 Charles Forsyth (1885–1951), British water polo player
 Colin Forsyth, English professional rugby league footballer
 Craig Forsyth (born 1989), Scottish footballer

D
 Darren Forsyth (born 1988), Irish footballer
 David Forsyth (disambiguation), several people

E
 Ed Forsyth (1887–1956), Major League Baseball third baseman

F
 Francis Forsyth, British criminal who was executed
 Frederick Forsyth (born 1938), British author and journalist

G
 Gavin Forsyth (born 1969), British alpine skier
 George Forsyth (disambiguation), several people
 Gordon Forsyth (1879–1952), Scottish ceramic designer, fine artist, art education innovator
 Guy Forsyth (born 1968), American Texas blues and blues rock singer, guitarist, harmonicist and songwriter

H
 H. A. Forsyth, known as Bert Forsyth, Australian film producer
 Harry Forsyth (1903–2004), Irish cricketer
 Heather Forsyth (born 1950), Canadian politician

I
 Iain Forsyth (born 1973), British artist and filmmaker
 Ian Forsyth (born 1946), Scottish rugby union player

J
 Jack Forsyth (1892–1966), American football coach
 James Forsyth (disambiguation), several people
 Jim Forsyth (born 1944), Australian rules footballer
 Jimmy Forsyth (1904–1982), Scottish football player, trainer and physiotherapist
 Jimmy Forsyth (photographer), (1913–2009), British amateur photographer
 John Forsyth (disambiguation), several people
 Joseph Forsyth (1763–1815), Scottish writer on Italy
 Joy-Anna Forsyth (born 1997), American television personality
 Julie Forsyth, Australian actress

K
 Kate Forsyth (born 1966), Australian writer
 Katherine Forsyth, Scottish historian
 Keeley Forsyth (born 1979), English actress and musician
 Keith Forsyth (1917–2006), Australian rules footballer
 Kimberly Forsyth, American beauty queen, winner of the 2006 "Miss Arkansas USA" competition

M
 Malcolm Forsyth (1936–2011), South African and Canadian trombonist and composer
 Mark Forsyth (born 1977), British writer and etymologist
 Matt Forsyth, Scottish professional football defender
 Michael Forsyth, Baron Forsyth of Drumlean (born 1954), British politician
 Michael Forsyth (footballer) (born 1966), English footballer
 Mina Forsyth (1921–1987), Canadian artist
 Moira Forsyth (1905–1991), English stained glass artist
 Murray Forsyth (born 1936), British political scientist

N
Neil Forsyth (born 1978), Scottish author, television writer and journalist

O
Olivia Forsyth (born 1960), former spy for the apartheid government in South Africa

P
 Peter Taylor Forsyth (1848–1921), Scottish theologian
 Phillip Forsyth, Canadian newspaper and radio journalist

R
 Richard Forsyth (born 1970), English footballer
 Robert Forsyth, contemporary Australian Anglican Bishop of South Sydney
 Robert Forsyth (writer) (1766–1845), Scottish writer, wrote The Beauties of Scotland
 Rosemary Forsyth (born 1943), Canadian-born American actress and model
 Ross Forsyth (born 1982), Scottish footballer

S
 Samuel Forsyth (1891–1918), New Zealand soldier
 Samuel Forsyth (Methodist) (1881–1960), Australian Methodist pastor and social worker
 Stewart Forsyth (born 1961), Scottish footballer

T
 Thomas Forsyth (disambiguation), several people
 Tim Forsyth (born 1973), Australian athlete
 Tony Forsyth, English actor

W
 Wesley Octavius Forsyth (1859–1937), Canadian pianist and composer
 William Forsyth (disambiguation), several people

See also 

 Clan Forsyth
 Forsythe (surname)